A Little South of Heaven is Australian live television play which aired in 1961 on ABC. It was based on a radio play by D'Arcy Niland and Ruth Park,

Plot
Set in Sydney. An Italian widow who has moved to Australia plans a marriage for her son Primo to an Italian, Serena, despite his affections for an Australian, Ruby. However he sends Serena the photo of Primo's more handsome cousin Franki.

Cast
Lyndall Barbour as Mama Chiapetta
Owen Weingott as Primo
Henry Gilbert as Father Felix
Delore Whiteman as Ruby
Ben Gabriel as Eddy
Anthony Wickert as Franki
Victoria Anoux as Serena
Alma Butterfield as Mrs Stringer

Radio Play
It was based on a radio play that had been performed in Australia and on the BBC in 1960. The BBC production starred Ina De La Haye and Robert Rietty.

Reception
The Sydney Morning Herald TV critic called it "rather stale fare" as the plot and characters were too predictable, adding that thematically the play "a warm-blooded extension of an Immigration Department pamphlet; bur its mainspring was a device as old as comedy and diplomacy... A neat, visually fluent, but also stodgily predictable, 60 minutes of viewing."

Val Marshall of the same paper thought it was almost as good as The Big Day, "a play that has remained pretty much par for the course for Australian TV drama ever since". She felt "in spite of some miscasting and an occasional spot where action bogged down in words... [it] came off remarkably well."

See also
List of television plays broadcast on Australian Broadcasting Corporation (1960s)

References

External links
A Little South of Heaven on IMDb
Full copy of script at National Archives of Australia
A Little South of Heaven TV adaptation at AustLit
original radio play at AustLit
1960 British radio play details at BBC
Complete TV script at National Archives of Australia

1961 television plays
1960s Australian television plays
Australian Broadcasting Corporation original programming
English-language television shows
Black-and-white Australian television shows
Australian live television shows
Films directed by Alan Burke (director)